A tradition since 1929, Historic Garden Week is sponsored by the Garden Club of Virginia, and draws nearly 26,000 visitors each year to tour private homes and gardens in communities both large and small across Virginia each spring. The nation's only statewide house and garden tour, this annual fundraiser contributes to our state and local economies.  The economic impact of Historic Garden Week over the last 50 years is estimated to be over $425 million.

Tour proceeds fund the restoration and preservation of more than 40 of Virginia's public historic gardens and landscapes, including projects at important landmarks like Monticello, Mount Vernon and Lewis Ginter Botanical Garden.  Tour proceeds also fund a research fellowship program in landscape architecture and a Centennial project with Virginia State Parks, which the Garden Club of Virginia helped to start. 

The Garden Club of Virginia celebrates the beauty of the land, conserves the gifts of nature and challenges future generations to build on this heritage.  From eight founding clubs in 1920 to 47 clubs and 3,500 civic leaders currently, this vibrant organization seeks to preserve the beauty of Virginia for its citizens and visitors.  Most notably, the Garden Club of Virginia is recognized for its largest public program, Historic Garden Week, taking place the last full week in April each spring.

External links

 Current Garden Week Schedule
 Garden Club of Virginia Website

Organizations based in Richmond, Virginia